Enrico Nizzi (born 1 August 1990 in Cavalese) is an Italian cross-country skier.

Nizzi competed at the 2014 Winter Olympics for Italy. He placed 44th in the qualifying round in the sprint, failing to advance to the knockout stages.

Nizzi made his World Cup debut in January 2012. As of April 2014, his best finish is a 13th, in a classical team sprint event at Asiago in 2013–14. His best individual finish is 25th, in a freestyle sprint race at Davos in 2013-14. His best World Cup overall finish is 147th, in 2013-14. His best World Cup finish in a discipline is 91st, in the 2013-14 sprint.

Cross-country skiing results
All results are sourced from the International Ski Federation (FIS).

Olympic Games

World Cup

Season standings

References

External links
 
 

1990 births
Living people
Olympic cross-country skiers of Italy
Cross-country skiers at the 2014 Winter Olympics
People from Cavalese
Italian male cross-country skiers
Sportspeople from Trentino